Igale is an administrative ward in the Mbeya Rural district of the Mbeya Region of Tanzania. In 2016 the Tanzania National Bureau of Statistics report there were 11,973 people in the ward, from 10,864 in 2012.

Villages and hamlets 
The ward has 5 villages, and 40 hamlets.

 Horongo
 Ibolelo
 Ileya
 Isusa
 Kiwanjani
 Laini
 Lutali
 Njombo
 Nsongole
 Igale
 Ihova
 Ilindi
 Ing'oli
 Ipembati
 Isonso
 Isyesye
 Itete
 Iyunga
 Itaga
 Isanzi A
 Isanzi B
 Ivumo
 Izuo
 Kiwanjani
 Mbibi
 Mpongota
 Yeriko
 Izumbwe I
 Itala
 Kilambo
 Kiwiga
 Lusungo
 Luzwiwi
 Mlima Baruti
 Mwashala
 Nyula
 Segela
 Ujamaa
 Shongo
 Ikeja
 Isela
 Kawetele
 Matula
 Mbushi
 Nkuyu

References 

Wards of Mbeya Region